The NOAA Diving Manual: Diving for Science and Technology is a book originally published by the US Department of Commerce for use as training and operational guidance for National Oceanographic and Atmospheric Administration divers. NOAA also publish a Diving Standards and Safety Manual (NDSSM), which describes the minimum safety standards for their diving operations. Several editions of the diving manual have been published, and several editors and authors have contributed over the years. The book is widely used as a reference work by professional and recreational divers.

Overview

The book summarizes the state of the art for scientific diving, and provides detailed but accessible explanations of the physics and physiology of diving, diving equipment, and diving procedures, at a level appropriate for the diving scientist and scientific diving team supervisor.

Content
The book is subdivided into sections and pages are numbered with reference to the section number. Sections of the second edition include: 

Regional and special diving
Air diving and decompression
Mixed gas and oxygen diving

Surface support platforms

Aquatic animals hazardous to divers

Accident management
The appendices include: 
References
Selected bibliography
NOAA Diving Regulations
US Navy Standard Air Decompression Tables
NOAA Nitrox I Diving and Decompression Tables
US Navy Recompression Treatment Tables
Nitrogen-Oxygen Saturation Treatment Table
Index

Reviews
The 4th edition was well received by Briscoe and Carmichael 2002 in Volume 15 of Oceanography

Impact
Although subtitled as Diving for Science and Technology, the NOAA Diving Manual is considered a useful reference for all fields of underwater diving.

Editions
The first edition was published by the US Department of Commerce in 1977,

The second edition was published by the US Department of Commerce in 1979 in hard? and soft cover. The editor was James W. Miller.

The third edition was published in 1991,

The fourth edition was published by Best Publishing Company in 2001 in hardcover, softcover and searchable CD-ROM versions The new material in the 4th edition includes the use of "oxygen-enriched air," commonly called Nitrox, which is widely used in both scientific and recreational diving to reduce the risk of decompression sickness.

The fifth edition was published in paperback by Best Publishing Company on June 10, 2013, with 875 pages.  

The sixth edition was published in paperback and as an e-book by Best Publishing Company on July 31, 2017, with 800 pages, . New chapters in the 6th edition are: Advanced Platform Support – diving with ROVs/AUVs, submersibles, and atmospheric diving systems, and Underwater Photography and Videography. Other chapters were significantly revised: Diving Equipment, Procedures for Scientific Dives, Rebreathers, and Polluted-Water Diving. The editor was Greg McFall.

References

National Oceanic and Atmospheric Administration
Underwater diving books